Aline Marie Raynal (4 February 1937 – 16 July 2022) is a French botanist and botanical illustrator noted for studying the taxonomy of parasitic and aquatic tropical plants, as well as plants of the Sahel desert. She was professor of botany at the Muséum National d´Histoire Naturelle de Paris. In 1995, her work was honored by the Institut de France. The minor planet 8651 Alineraynal was named in her honor.

Works

References 

1937 births
20th-century French women scientists
20th-century French botanists
Living people
21st-century French botanists